Copwatch (also Cop Watch or Cop-Watch) is a network of activist organizations, typically autonomous and focused in local areas, in the United States, Canada and Europe that observe and document police activity while looking for signs of police misconduct and police brutality. They believe that monitoring police activity on the streets is a way to prevent police brutality.

The stated goal of at least one Copwatch group is to engage in monitoring and videotaping police activity in the interest of holding the police accountable in the events involving assaults or police misconduct. They also develop theoretical and practical approaches to security and justice structures to replace the police (abolitionism). They practice an intersectional critique of capitalism and analyze crime as a consequence of social problems that cannot be fought by surveillance and punishment. Therefore, they demand social solutions especially in relation to violence in structural power relations (sexist, racist, anti-Semitic violence), an accepting drug approach as well as material security.

Copwatch was first started in Berkeley, California, in 1990.

Methods
The main function of most Copwatch groups is monitoring police activity. "Copwatchers" go out on foot or driving patrols in their communities and record interactions between the police, suspects, and civilians. Copwatchers hope that monitoring police activity will provide a deterrent against police misconduct. Some groups also patrol at protests and demonstrations to ensure that police do not violate the rights of protesters. One Copwatch organization states that it has a policy of non-interference with the police, although this may not be true for all groups. In Phoenix, Arizona, copwatchers have increased efforts of "reverse surveillance" on the police in an effort to document racial profiling. They believe that Arizona Senate Bill 1070, a controversial law that allows police to question people they believe are illegal immigrants, will increase racial profiling by police.

Copwatch groups also hold "Know Your Rights" forums to educate the public about their legal and human rights when interacting with the police, and some groups organize events to highlight problems of police abuse in their communities.

Copwatch calls for intervention in or critical accompaniment of police controls in order to support those affected, especially by racial or class profiling. Educational work regarding the powers of the police as well as rights towards the police is therefore a focus of the work in order to empower more people for these interventions.

Activities

Response to the killing of Kendra James 
In 2003, Kendra James was fatally shot by Portland, Oregon Officer Scott McCollister as she attempted to drive away from a traffic stop with Officer McCollister attempting to pull her out of the vehicle. After the shooting Copwatch offered a reward for a photograph of McCollister. It then produced and distributed posters bearing McCollister's photo and the phrase "Getting away with murder".

The editorial staff of Willamette Week opined that the poster was "inflamed rhetoric" which would harm "the relationship between the Portland police and the community it serves", and claimed that protest posters put up by the Rose City chapter of Copwatch were aimed at "inciting generalized anti-cop hysteria at the expense of informed criticism".

A member of the Rose City Copwatch group said that the shooting "demonstrate[s] a culture of racism and brutality that's really sort of at the core of policing". A grand jury later found no criminal wrongdoing on McCollister's part.

William Cardenas video 
 
On November 3, 2006, CopWatch LA posted a video showing the arrest of William Cardenas, whom police described as "a known gang member who had been wanted on a felony warrant for receiving stolen property". According to the arrest report, when officers tried to arrest Cardenas as he was drinking beer on the sidewalk with two others, he fled, but was caught and tripped by the officers, who then began to attempt to handcuff Cardenas as he fought with the officers to avoid being arrested.

The video, in which Cardenas struggles to prevent the police from handcuffing him, shows an officer repeatedly punching him in the face while trying to force his hands together. The officers indicated that they were unable to subdue Cardenas with pepper spray, which seemed to have "little effect", and that some of the punches were delivered in response to Cardenas putting his hand on one officer's gun holster during the struggle. According to the arrest report, several witnesses confirmed that Cardenas threw punches at the officers, who were only able to handcuff him after two of his friends arrived and told him to stop fighting.

The circulation of this video led to nationwide media coverage of Copwatch, and, although the LAPD had begun a use-of-force investigation the same day as the arrest, prompted an additional investigation into police conduct by the Federal Bureau of Investigation. A Superior Court commissioner had previously concluded that the use of force was reasonable because Cardenas was resisting arrest.

International Day against Police Violence 15th March 
On the International Day against Police Violence, the different Copwatch groups organize actions together or in relation to each other. They regularly focus on a specific aspect of police violence, such as racist and sexist police violence or violence against the growing climate justice movement critical of capitalism.

Struggles against new police and security laws 
The increase of resources and powers for the police is criticized as well as the omnipotence for social conflicts. Part of this (in their opinion immanent) logic of increasing power is also militarization, which is perceived as devastating, especially in the German context, because it further softens the principle of separation as a lesson from National Socialism.

For this reason, many Copwatch groups are also involved in alliances against new police and security laws that expand the police's areas of responsibility and legal possibilities.which in fact leads to more policing social phenomena instead of solving the material roots of inequality.

Information and documentation points 
Many local Copwatch groups have created information and/or documentation centers for their catchment area. Victims of discriminatory behavior or police violence can turn to the groups for legal, financial or emotional support. This work, especially the public scandalization, has helped to make existing problems of security institutions visible. In Germany in particular, the mapping and collection of right-wing, neo-Nazi and racist incidents, including right-wing terrorist networks, has brought to light previously unchallenged deep-seated grievances that have already triggered changes in practical policy.

Educational work 
One of the core concerns of the Copwatch groups is to document police stops and support those affected. To this end, there is a call to film the police. Workshops are also given to learn how to intervene in police checks, what rights one has vis-à-vis the police and what powers the police have at all.

Criticism of Capitalism 
Copwatch embeds its critique of the police in a larger socio-critical framework that focuses primarily on injustice within capitalism. Copwatch groups share a feminist, anti-racist, and anti-fascist consensus. In doing so, they call for alternatives to the current way of dealing with material inequality, psychological problems and strive for a socio-ecological transformation of society.

Awards 
In 2013 Berkeley Copwatch was awarded the James Madison Freedom of Information Award by the Society of Professional Journalists, Northern California chapter, for "effective use of public records to block a Homeland Security grant for putting an armored military vehicle on the streets of Albany and Berkeley."

Criticism 
Joe Arpaio, the former Sheriff of Maricopa County, Arizona, who was accused of police brutality among his deputies and corrections officers and was personally convicted of contempt of court, said that his opponents' videotaping of police during traffic stops create safety concerns for his deputies.

Tim Dees, former police officer and editor-in-chief of Officer.com, alleges that Copwatch selectively distributes video and photographic media to "spin" incidents against law enforcement.

List of local Copwatch organizations 
The following is an inexhaustive list of local Copwatch organizations
 Berkeley, California
 Oakland, California
 Austin, Texas
 Ferguson and St. Louis, Missouri
 Chicago, Illinois
 Portland, Oregon
 Los Angeles, California
 New York City, New York
 Paris, France
 Charleston, South Carolina
 Rock Hill, South Carolina
Tampa, Florida
 Hamburg, Germany
Frankfurt am Main, Germany
Leipzig, Germany

There are also groups working on the same topics:

 KOP: Campaign for victims of racist police violence in Bremen, Berlin, Kiel (Germany)
 KGP: Cooperation against police violence (Dresden)

Media coverage 
Active press work and the creation of its own communication channels have helped to bring police criticism increasingly into the public eye.

On 2 August 2016, the BBC documentary NYPD: Biggest Gang in New York? aired on the British television channel BBC One, focusing on the activities of cop watchers in New York, including Ramsey Orta who filmed the death of Eric Garner.

The documentary film Copwatch premiered at the 2017 Tribeca Film Festival, which depicted the organization WeCopwatch, including segments on Ramsey Orta, Kevin Moore, who filmed the police abuse of Freddie Gray, and David Whitt who lived in the apartment complex where Michael Brown was killed, as well as Jacob Crawford, who seeded and co-founded Copwatch groups inspired by the Berkeley Copwatch group.

On October 23, 2019, BET Network premiered a show named Copwatch America. The network describes the docu-series as a "provocative look into police brutality and whistleblowers battling the issue".

See also 
 These Streets are Watching
 Peaceful Streets Project
 Photography is Not a Crime (PINAC)
 Cop Block
 Inverse surveillance
 Legal observer (LO)
 Witness (organization)
 Police accountability
 Video evidence

References

Further reading 
 
 Daniel J. Chacón, "When cops allegedly step out of line, group steps up pressure", Rocky Mountain News, November 18, 2005, Sec. News, Pg. 31A.
 
 Matt Leedy, "Dozens learn to tape police - Copwatch leader gives Fresnans tips on safely monitoring officers.", Fresno Bee, Aug. 28, 2005, Sec. News, Pg. B1.

Media 
 The Streets Is Watching (Cincinnati), Jacobs Ladder Production (via Google Video)
 When Police Riot, Jacobs Ladder Production (via YouTube)
 Extremist, Jacobs Ladder Production (via Current)
 Copwatch, Guerrilla News Network (via Internet Archive)

External links 
CopWatch website
Berkley Copwatch on YouTube

Civil rights organizations
Police oversight organizations
Organizations based in Berkeley, California
Non-profit organizations based in California
Organizations established in 1990
1990 establishments in California